Šmotiškiai (formerly ) is a village in Kėdainiai district municipality, in Kaunas County, in central Lithuania. According to the 2011 census, the village had a population of 47 people.

History
The first mention of Šmotiškiai comes from 1593. At that time it had 13 voloks of agriculture land and 15 voloks of forest land. At the 18th century it was a royal village.

Demography

Images

References

Villages in Kaunas County
Kėdainiai District Municipality